Chile national field hockey team may refer to:
 Chile men's national field hockey team
 Chile women's national field hockey team